Samet Hasan Yıldıran (born 19 September 1992) is a Turkish footballer who plays for Aksaray 1989 SK. He made his Süper Lig debut on 18 March 2012.

References

External links
 
 Samet Hasan Yıldıran at eurosport.com

1992 births
Living people
People from Ünye
Turkish footballers
Samsunspor footballers
Ünyespor footballers
Süper Lig players
Association football midfielders